Robert Barker (19 June 1847 – 11 November 1915) was an English footballer who played for England, first in goal and later as a forward, in the first international match against Scotland.

Career
Barker was born in Wouldham, Kent and was educated at Marlborough College where he played both rugby and association football. After leaving school he joined Hertfordshire Rangers to concentrate on "soccer". He represented both Middlesex and Kent during his career, as well as making occasional appearances for Westminster School and Wanderers.

He was selected to play in goal for England's first ever international match against Scotland on 30 November 1872. The original selection for goalkeeper, Alexander Morten, was unavailable and, according to Graham Betts in "England – Player by player", "Barker was chosen (to play in goal) because he was the biggest and slowest player in the England team and because his rugby experience and handling of the ball would come in useful" Barker kept a clean sheet for the first half and at some point in the game he switched places with William Maynard. At 25 years, 165 days Barker was the oldest player in the England line-up.

As he was in goal and therefore first in the lineup for England's first international match, Barker officially has legacy number 1 for England.

Barker was not selected for any further internationals and went on to pursue a career as a civil engineer, later becoming Chief Assistant Engineer to the London, Chatham and Dover Railway and then the South Eastern Railway.

He died on 11 November 1915, aged 68.

References

External links

England profile

1847 births
1915 deaths
People from Wouldham
People educated at Marlborough College
English footballers
England international footballers
Association football goalkeepers
British civil engineers
Wanderers F.C. players